Penacova ( or ) is a town and a municipality in the Coimbra District, in Portugal. The population in 2011 was 15,251, in an area of 216.73 km².

Parishes
Administratively, the municipality is divided into 8 civil parishes (freguesias):
 Carvalho
 Figueira de Lorvão
 Friúmes e Paradela
 Lorvão
 Oliveira do Mondego e Travanca do Mondego
 Penacova
 São Pedro de Alva e São Paio do Mondego
 Sazes do Lorvão

Demographics

Notable people 
 António José de Almeida (1866 in Penacova, São Pedro de Alva – 1929) a politician, the sixth President of Portugal, 1919 until 1923.

References

External links 
  
 Photos from Penacova

 
Municipalities of Coimbra District